Tontadarya Matha, in the heart of Gadag city, Karnataka, India, is one of the Virakta Mathas.  It is of the Lingayat sect of Hinduism.

Also known as Sri Jagadguru Tontadarya Sansthana Math, Dambal-Gadag, it has a rich history and tradition. This math is engaged in many educational and literary activities in and around Gadag.

External links
JTMath

Buildings and structures in Gadag district
Hindu monasteries in India